Santhi Nivasam is a 1960 Indian Telugu-language drama film directed by C. S. Rao. The film stars Akkineni Nageswara Rao, Rajasulochana, Kantha Rao, Krishna Kumari and Devika. It is an adaptation of Palagummi Padmaraju's Telugu play of the same name, which itself was based on B. S. Ramiah's Tamil play Malliyam Mangalam.

Santhi Nivasam was released on 14 January 1960. The film was a commercial success, running for over 100 days in several theatres. It was remade in Hindi as Gharana (1961).

Plot 

Ramadasu is a wealthy and mild-mannered man. Santhamma is his aggressive, petty-minded and controlling wife who always ill-treats her daughters-in-law, the widow Ramani and the devout Lakshmi, who is married to Santhamma's second son Raju. Gopi, the youngest son, is a bachelor, and the daughter Chitti leaves her husband Simhalu, to live with her parents. Gopi falls in love with Radha, who has a vixen stepmother and an understanding father, lawyer Seetapathi Rao.

A jealous Chitti creates suspicion in Raju about the relationship between Lakshmi and Gopi. Raju thinks that they are having an affair, he makes observations but is not ready to confront anyone. Raju's suspicions are not laid to rest even when Gopi marries Radha. Raju starts to drink and ends up getting friendly with a childhood friend, Ragini. Gopi, with the help of Simhalu and Radha, manages to set things right and bring about peace.

Cast 
Akkineni Nageswara Rao as Gopi
Rajasulochana as Radha
Kantha Rao as Raju
Krishna Kumari as Ragini
Devika as Lakshmi
V. Nagayya as Ramadasu
Relangi as Narasimhalu
Ramana Reddy as Captain Paramanandaiah
K. V. S. Sarma as Seetapati Rao
Suryakantham as Santamma
Surabhi Balasaraswathi as Chitti
Hemalatha as Ramani

Production

Development 
The actors Vallam Narasimha Rao and Padmanabham acquired the Telugu rights of S. V. Sahasranamam's Tamil play Malliyam Mangalam, which was written by B. S. Ramiah, for their first stage production made under the Rekha & Murali Arts banner. The Telugu version, Santhi Nivasam, was written by Palagummi Padmaraju. The play, which starred Padmanabhan and Meenakumari, was an immense success, and caught the attention of producers Sundarlal Nahata, T. Aswathanarayana and director C. S. Rao, who saw "immense potential" in it and bought the film rights. Samudrala Jr. was hired to make changes, such as expanding the story and creating new characters for the film adaptation, which was also titled Santhi Nivasam and was produced under Sri Productions. He also worked as a dialogue writer and lyricist. Cinematography was handled by Kamal Ghosh (with J. Sathyanarayana serving as "operative cameraman"), editing by N. M. Shankar and C. Hari Rao.

Casting and filming 
Akkineni Nageswara Rao was chosen to play Gopi, reprising the role originally played by Padmanabham in the Telugu play. This role was rewritten for the film as the male lead, unlike the play where it was a supporting role. C. S. Rao, who used to enact scenes for his actors, accidentally slipped during one such exercise on the doormat before Ragini's (Krishna Kumari) house set while entering, but immediately managed to balance himself. Kantha Rao, who portrayed Gopi's older brother Raju, believed this was intentional and part of the story, and did exactly the same when filming the scene. After this, C. S. Rao told Kanta Rao, "Any way, it now turned into a symbolic shot for the critics. For the first time you are entering into another woman’s house and the slip represents your fall and the balancing act symbolises your control." Except for two songs which were shot at Brindavan Gardens in Mysore, the rest of the film was completed in one schedule.

Soundtrack 
The soundtrack was composed by Ghantasala, and the lyrics were written by Samudrala Ramanujacharya. Many of the songs were adapted from Hindi songs; "Aasalu Theerchave" was based on "Meethi Meethi Baton Se" from Qaidi No. 911, "Chakkanidaana" was based on the title song of Dil Deke Dekho, "Raave Radha Rani Raave" was based on "Jhumta Mausam" from Ujala, and "Come Come" was based on "Tim Tim Tim" from Mausi. "Sri Raghuram", "Kalanaina Nee Valape" and "Ragala Saragala" were original compositions.

Release and reception 
Santhi Nivasam was released on 14 January 1960. The film was a commercial success, running for over 100 days in several theatres. It was remade in Hindi as Gharana (1961), and dubbed in Malayalam as Shantinivas (1962).

References

External links 
 

1960 drama films
1960 films
1960s Telugu-language films
Films based on adaptations
Films directed by C. S. Rao
Films scored by Ghantasala (musician)
Indian drama films
Indian films based on plays
Telugu films remade in other languages